Diplodon is a genus of freshwater pearly mussel, an aquatic bivalve in the Hyriidae family.

The genus includes the following species:

 Diplodon chilensis
 Diplodon dunkerianus
 Diplodon expansus
 Diplodon fontaineanus
 Diplodon granosus
 Diplodon pfeifferi

Diplodon websteri is a synonym for Cucumerunio websteri.

References

Hyriidae
Bivalve genera
Taxonomy articles created by Polbot